William Richard Annesley, 4th Earl Annesley (21 February 1830 – 10 August 1874), styled Viscount Glerawley until 1838,  was an Irish-born British Conservative politician.

Background
Born at Rutland Square (now Parnell Square), Dublin, Annesley was the eldest son of William Annesley, 3rd Earl Annesley, by his second wife Priscilla Cecilia, daughter of Hugh Moore. He was educated at the University of Cambridge.

Political career
Annesley succeeded in the earldom in August 1838 on the death of his father. As this was a title in the Peerage of Ireland it did not entitle him to a seat in the House of Lords. He was instead elected to the House of Commons for Great Grimsby in the 1852 general election, a seat he held until 1857. In 1867 he was elected an Irish Representative Peer, which he remained until his death.

Personal life
He inherited the Castlewellan Estate in County Down and built Castlewellan Castle on the estate c.1856.

Lord Annesley died at Cowes, Isle of Wight, in August 1874, aged 44. He was unmarried and was succeeded in his titles by his younger brother, Hugh.

References

External links 

1830 births
1874 deaths
Irish representative peers
UK MPs 1852–1857
UK MPs who inherited peerages
Conservative Party (UK) MPs for English constituencies
William
19th-century Anglo-Irish people
Members of the Parliament of the United Kingdom for Great Grimsby
4